Frank Block may refer to:
 Frank Block (Australian politician) (1899–1971)
 Frank Block (American politician)